This is a list of banks in Taiwan, including the government-owned banks of the Taiwan.

Central Bank 
 Central Bank of the Republic of China (Taiwan)

Governmental institutions

Existing National Institutions
 Agricultural Bank of Taiwan
 Export–Import Bank of the Republic of China

Postal Savings Bank
Chunghwa Post

Taiwan-based banks
Bank of Taiwan
Land Bank of Taiwan
Taiwan Cooperative Bank

Hua Nan Commercial Bank
Chang Hwa Bank
Citibank Taiwan
Shanghai Commercial and Savings Bank
Taipei Fubon Bank
Taipei Star Bank
Cathay United Bank
Bank of Kaohsiung
Mega International Commercial Bank 
O-Bank
Taiwan Business Bank
Standard Chartered Bank (Taiwan)
Taichung Bank
King's Town Bank
HSBC Bank (Taiwan)
Hwatai Bank
Taiwan Shin Kong Commercial Bank
Sunny Bank
Bank of Panshin
COTA Commercial Bank
Union Bank of Taiwan
Far Eastern international Bank
Yuanta Bank
Bank SinoPac
E.SUN Commercial Bank
KGI Bank
DBS Bank (Taiwan)
Taishin International Bank
Jih Sun International Commercial Bank
EnTie Commercial Bank
CTBC Bank - China Trust
Hualien Business Bank - closed 2007

Foreign banks
American Express Bank
Australia and New Zealand Banking Group Limited
BBVA
Bangkok Bank
Banque de l'Indochine
Barclays Bank
BNP Paribas
Bank of America
Bank of East Asia
BNY Mellon
MUFG Bank
Crédit Agricole Corporate and Investment Bank
Citibank
DBS Bank
Deutsche Bank
BNP Paribas Fortis
HSBC
ING Group
JPMorgan Chase
Metrobank (Philippines)
Mizuho Corporate Bank
Natixis
OCBC Bank
Société Générale
Standard Bank of South Africa
Standard Chartered Bank
State Street Bank and Trust Company
Sumitomo Mitsui Banking Corporation
UBS AG
United Overseas Bank
Wells Fargo Bank

Mainland Chinese banks
Bank of China
Bank of Communications
China Construction Bank

 
Banks
Taiwan
Taiwan